Aksdalsvatnet is a lake in the municipality of Tysvær in Rogaland county, Norway.  The  lake lies southeast of the village of Førre and south of the village of Aksdal.  The European route E134 highway runs along the northern shore of the lake and the European route E39 highway runs along the eastern shore of the lake.

See also
List of lakes in Norway

References

Tysvær
Lakes of Rogaland